The 1960–61 Eintracht Frankfurt season was the 61st season in the club's football history. In Oberliga Süd the club played in the Oberliga Süd, then one of many top tiers of German football. It was the club's 16th season in the Oberliga Süd.
In the German Championship Qualifiers finished as 3rd.

Matches

Legend

Friendlies

Oberliga Süd

League fixtures and results

League table

Results summary

Results by round

German Championship Pre-qualifiers

German Championship Qualifiers

League fixtures and results

League table

Results summary

Results by round

DFB-Pokal / SFV-Pokal

1959–60

1960–61

Squad

Squad and statistics

|}

Transfers

In:

Out:

Notes

Sources 

 German archive site

See also
 1961 German football championship

External links
 Official English Eintracht website

1960-61
German football clubs 1960–61 season